Tirana railway station was the central railway hub of Tirana, Albania. The railway was connected to other cities in Albania including Vlorë and Durrës. The railway station was said to have no luggage office. On 2 September 2013, the station was closed for passenger and freight transport, and was demolished to make room for a new boulevard that leads over the station area to the north. A completely new district will be created. As a result, the Tirana station was moved to Vorë in 2013, and later to renovated Kashar station in May 2015. The former Kashar-Tiranë line around 10 km in length was replaced with a bus service.

In the northwestern district of Tirana, Laprakë, a new station will be built, which is planned as a multi-functional terminal for railway, tram and bus. Until its opening, the railway transport between Tirana and Kashar remains closed.

Gallery

See also
Durrës–Tiranë railway

References

External links 

Buildings and structures in Tirana
Railway stations in Albania
Railway stations opened in 1949
1949 establishments in Albania
2013 disestablishments in Albania
Railway stations closed in 2013
Buildings and structures demolished in 2013